Balkhi ("from/ of Balkh," a city in modern-day Afghanistan) may refer to:

People:
Abu Ma'shar al-Balkhi (787-886), Afghan astrologer, astronomer and Islamic philosopher
Abu-Shakur Balkhi (915-?), Persian poet
Abu Zayd al-Balkhi (850-934), Persian geographer, mathematician, physician, psychologist and scientist
Hiwi al-Balkhi, 9th century exegete and Biblical critic
Ismael Balkhi (1918-1968), Afghan political activist and Hazara reformist leader
Jalal ad-Din Muhammad Balkhi (1207-1273), better known in the English-speaking world as Rumi, Persian Muslim poet, jurist, theologian and Sufi mystic
Rabia Balkhi, possibly first female New Persian poet believed to have lived in the 10th century
Ibn Balkhi, a conventional name for a 12th-century Iranian historian and author of the Persian book Fārs-Nāma
Sediqa Balkhi, Afghan politician
Sultan Balkhi, 14th-century Muslim preacher based in Bengal

See also
Balkh, Afghanistan
Balki (disambiguation)

References

Persian-language surnames